Viḷḷarmental is one of 54 parishes (administrative divisions) in Cangas del Narcea, a municipality within the province and autonomous community of Asturias, in northern Spain.

Towns 
 Ḷḷadréu
 Los Pedrueños
 Los Tablaos
 Viḷḷarmental

Other places 
 Ḷḷamazales

References

Parishes in Cangas del Narcea